IBM Eagle is a 127-qubit quantum processor. IBM claims that it can not be simulated by any classical computer. It is two times bigger than China's Jiuzhang 2. It was revealed on the 16th of November 2021 and was claimed to be the most powerful quantum processor ever made until November 2022, when the IBM Osprey overtook it with 433 qubits. It is almost twice as powerful as their last processor, the 'Hummingbird', which had 65 quantum bits and was created in 2020. IBM believes that the processes used in creating the 'Eagle', will be the backbone for their future processors. Their roadmap indicates that in 2023 the 'Condor' will be released with 1,121 qubits. They have also started development on IBM Quantum System Two, as the first one (IBM Quantum System One) is not powerful enough to keep up with the upscaling of their processors.

References

External links 
 IBM’s roadmap for scaling quantum technology

Quantum computing
IBM products
IBM microprocessors